Diogma glabrata is a species of fly in the family Cylindrotomidae. It is found in the  Palearctic .

References

External links
Images representing Diogma at BOLD

Cylindrotomidae
Insects described in 1818
Nematoceran flies of Europe